Ngau Pei Sha is a village in Siu Lek Yuen, Sha Tin District, Hong Kong.

Administration
Ngau Pei Sha is a recognized village under the New Territories Small House Policy. It is one of the villages represented within the Sha Tin Rural Committee. For electoral purposes, Ngau Pei Sha is part of the Yu Yan constituency, which was formerly represented by Lo Yuet-chau until July 2021.

References

External links

 Delineation of area of existing village Ngau Pei Sha (Sha Tin) for election of resident representative (2019 to 2022)

Villages in Sha Tin District, Hong Kong
Siu Lek Yuen